The Coriolis Effect is a 1994 short black-and-white film starring James Wilder, Jennifer Rubin, Dana Ashbrook and Corinne Bohrer, featuring a voice-only appearance from Quentin Tarantino. It was written and directed by Louis Venosta, and it was produced by Kathryn Arnold and Secondary Modern Motion Pictures.

Background
The independent film was premiered in America at the New York New Directors/New Films Festival on March 26, 1994. It was the winning short film at the Venice Film Festival of 1994, where it won Venosta the Telepiù Award.

The film was released in America on both VHS and DVD via Vanguard Cinema. The release, Kisses in the Dark, compromises four independent award-winning short films: The Coriolis Effect, Solly's Diner, Looping and Joe. The artwork for the release highlighted The Coriolis Effect as the main film, with Rubin pictured on the front and both Rubin and Wilder's names credited, whilst noting the cameo appearance of Tarantino. In 2007, the collection was made available via Amazon Video.

Seemingly, the film dated back a couple of years before its release, where in The Hollywood Reporter of October 7, 1991, the issue noted that "Principal photography was completed last month in northern Texas on 'The Coriolis Effect,' a short film written and directed by Louis Venosta."

For the film's limited theatrical release, it was paired up as a double feature with a 1993 German short film, Making Up!. On October 21, 1994, the Los Angeles Daily News noted that the pairing of the films would court disaster. "Putting the short films 'The Coriolis Effect' and 'Making Up!' together on the same bill, as the Nuart has this week, is like fixing up RuPaul, the cross-dressing entertainer, on a blind date with a tomboy. It'll never work, because each wants too much to be the other."

Plot
Two young lovers Ray and Suzy are split apart by the revelation of Suzy's one night stand with Ray's best friend, and fellow storm chaser, Stanley. Both friends operate a Toteable Tornado Observatory ("Toto" for short) in a pickup truck. Before Ray and Suzy can resolve their issues, Ray is called away to chase the biggest tornado producing storm to hit Texas in a century along with Stanley. As they race towards the storm, arguing and fighting with each other, they come across a mysterious woman named Ruby, who changes the course of their destiny and scramble their senses and lives.

Cast
 Jennifer Rubin as Ruby
 James Wilder as Stanley
 Dana Ashbrook as Ray
 Corinne Bohrer as Suzy
 David Patch as Terry
 Quentin Tarantino as Panhandle Slim (voice)

Reception

In the 1996 book Tarantino A to Zed: The Films of Quentin Tarantino, authors Alan Barnes and Marcus Hearn stated: 

In the Chicago Tribune issue of April 13, 1995, movie critic Michael Wilmington gave three and a half out of five stars, and stated: 

On November 4, 1994, Kansas City Star gave the film three out of five stars, along with the German short film Making Up!.

Also on November 4, 1994, Paul Sherman of Boston Herald compared the film with Making Up!, stating: 

In the New York Times issue of March 26, 1994, author Caryn James reviewed the film based on the showing at the film festival. The review stated: 

In The Michigan Daily of January 24, 1995, Shirley Lee reviewed the film, stating: 

In the Los Angeles Times of October 21, 1994, writer Kevin Thomas stated: 

The Sarasota Herald-Tribune of February 17, 1995, saw movie critic Bill Kelley reviewing the film and the Making Up! film together, stating: 

The News Tribune of October 15, 1994 stated that "'Making Up!' and 'The Coriolis Effect' is an inspired pairing of short films, one from Germany and one from the United States." The review also noted the character Ruby (Jennifer Rubin) with her "literally tempestuous personality".

References

External links
 

1994 short films
1994 films
American short films
1990s English-language films